Sandro Miguel Laranjeira Mendes (born 4 February 1977), known simply as Sandro, is a Cape Verdean former professional footballer who played as a central midfielder, currently manager of Portuguese club União Futebol Comércio e Indústria.

Most of his career was spent with Vitória de Setúbal, where he played for three separate spells. In the Primeira Liga, he amassed totals of 195 matches and six goals over nine seasons.

Sandro was born in Portugal, and holds Portuguese citizenship. Internationally, he played for Portugal's under-20 and under-21 teams before representing Cape Verde at senior level.

Club career
Sandro was born in Pinhal Novo, Setúbal District, Portugal. He started his career at Vitória de Setúbal and made his Primeira Liga debut in 1995, but moved to Hércules CF in the Spanish Segunda División aged 19 in 1997.

In January 1999, Sandro joined La Liga club Villarreal CF on loan, but made just two appearances in a six-month spell in a season that ended in relegation. He returned to Spain's second tier the following campaign, with UD Salamanca.

After another five-year spell with Vitória Setúbal, FC Porto acquired Sandro's services for 2005–06. Having failed to make a competitive appearance, he was loaned to Turkey's Manisaspor until January 2006, when he rejoined Vitória for a third stint.

In the 2009–10 season, Sandro played 26 matches and scored once, in a 2–1 away win against relegation rivals Leixões S.C. on 14 March 2010, as Setúbal retained top-flight status. In July 2010 the 33-year-old left for Spain again, signing for Segunda División B side AD Ceuta where he was joined by several compatriots. 

Prior to the start of the 2011–12 campaign, Sandro signed with Associação Naval 1º de Maio of the Portuguese Segunda Liga.

International career
Sandro won 12 caps for Portugal at youth level, four at under-20 and eight at under-21. He chose to represent Cape Verde as a senior, making his debut on 5 June 2004 in a 2–1 away loss to South Africa in the 2006 FIFA World Cup qualifiers.

Coaching career
After retiring, Mendes returned to Vitória de Setúbal as youth system coordinator and under-17 coach. In 2014, he was appointed manager of amateurs AC Alcacerense where he completed his coaching licence.

Mendes returned to the Estádio do Bonfim in June 2016, again being in charge of the youth system. He then became Vitória's director of football. 

On 25 January 2019, after the dismissal of Lito Vidigal, Mendes was named head coach until the end of the season, and Jorge Andrade was named as his assistant. On 26 October, following a 0–0 home draw against C.S. Marítimo that still left the team above the relegation zone, he was dismissed.

Mendes returned to active on 27 September 2021, taking charge of Amora F.C. in the Portuguese third division.

Criminal charges

In March 2013, Mendes was arrested by the National Counterterrorism unit of the Judicial Police, which was competent to investigate the crime of kidnapping. He was suspected of abducting his 31-year-old ex-wife and raping her, and also of the repeated practice of domestic violence on his former partner and mother of his youngest daughter.

Honours
Vitória Setúbal
Taça de Portugal: 2004–05
Taça da Liga: 2007–08

References

External links

1977 births
Living people
Portuguese sportspeople of Cape Verdean descent
Sportspeople from Setúbal District
Black Portuguese sportspeople
Cape Verdean footballers
Portuguese footballers
Association football midfielders
Primeira Liga players
Liga Portugal 2 players
Vitória F.C. players
FC Porto players
Associação Naval 1º de Maio players
La Liga players
Segunda División players
Segunda División B players
Hércules CF players
Villarreal CF players
UD Salamanca players
AD Ceuta footballers
Süper Lig players
Manisaspor footballers
Portugal youth international footballers
Portugal under-21 international footballers
Cape Verde international footballers
Cape Verdean expatriate footballers
Portuguese expatriate footballers
Expatriate footballers in Spain
Expatriate footballers in Turkey
Cape Verdean expatriate sportspeople in Turkey
Portuguese expatriate sportspeople in Spain
Cape Verdean football managers
Portuguese football managers
Primeira Liga managers
Vitória F.C. managers